Yevgeny (or Evgeni) Ignatov may refer to several people:

 Yevgeny Petrovich Ignatov, Hero of the Soviet Union
 Yevgeny Ignatov (canoeist), Russian sprint canoeist
 Yevgeny Ignatov (runner), retired long-distance runner from Bulgaria
 Evgeni Ignatov (footballer), Bulgarian footballer